Dănuleşti may refer to several villages in Romania:

 Dănuleşti and Muceşti-Dănuleşti, villages in Buda Commune, Buzău County
 Dănuleşti, a village in Gurasada Commune, Hunedoara County

See also 
 Dănești (disambiguation)